is one of 24 wards of Osaka, Japan.  The  area of Ikuno-ku is well known for the large number of Koreans, particularly Korean Japanese citizens (Zainichi Korean) living there, as well as for its large number of yakiniku (Korean-style barbecue) restaurants. Many families from Korea have lived in the Tsuruhashi district for three generations or more.
Ikuno-ku is located in the southeastern part of Osaka City and is adjacent to Higashiosaka City in the east, Higashinari-ku of Osaka City in the north, Tennoji-ku in the west, and Abeno-ku, Higashisumiyoshi-ku and Hirano-ku in the south.

Population
The population and density of Ikuno-ku are the sixth largest in Osaka City, but are declining. The number of foreigner registrations is the largest in the city, and one out of four residents here is of foreign nationality. The proportion of senior citizens is also higher than the overall Osaka City average.

As aging of the population progresses in Ikuno-ku, diverse services and assistances are being provided for senior citizens. The municipal home nursing service center, Okachiyama, is among them.

Living
Ikuno-ku is a typical town of small businesses from the pre-World War II period.  Although the dense concentration of houses, factories and shops along narrow streets is a fire hazard, traditionally close human relationships contribute to an active local community. The narrow streets require substantial redevelopment. The completion of the Expressway Namba-Katae Line is eagerly awaited, as there are few east-west avenues.

Inside Ikuno-ku run JR Loop Line, Kintetsu Nara and Osaka Lines, as well as Subway Sennichimae Line, but none of them go through central Ikuno. The extension of Subway No.8 Line is strongly desired to provide the district citizens with railway transportation for everyday life.

Many projects are currently underway to develop the district into a comfortable residential area well balanced with its commercial and industrial functions. In southern Ikuno new apartment houses are being built for original residents, as well as many town squares. Construction of urban roads and parks is also planned. Residents of the Tsuruhashi area organized the New Town Development Committee, which was followed by the establishment of the New Tsuruhashi Redevelopment Association, both serving as a stimulus for residents-oriented town development.

Education

North Korean schools include:
 East Osaka Korean Middle School (東大阪朝鮮中級学校)
 Ikuno Korean Elementary School (生野朝鮮初級学校)
 Osaka Korean No. 4 Elementary School (大阪朝鮮第四初級学校)

Transport

Rail
West Japan Railway Company (These stations are located in Tennoji-ku but close to Ikuno-ku.)
Osaka Loop Line: Teradacho Station – Momodani Station – Tsuruhashi Station
Kintetsu Railway
Osaka Line and Nara Line: Tsuruhashi Station – Imazato Station
Osaka Metro
Sennichimae Line: Shoji Station – Kita-Tatsumi Station – Minami-Tatsumi Station

Road
Katsuyama dori
Imazatosuji
National Route 25
Uchi-kanjosen (National Route 479)

Notable people
Akiko Wada, Zainichi Korean singer and TV personality (Real Name: Kim Bokja, Hangul: 김복자)
Hidekazu Mitsuyama, Japanese former baseball player
Isao Taniguchi, Japanese former footballer
Kawai Okada, Japanese former actress and businesswoman
Kazuo Kitagawa, Japanese politician and former Minister of Agriculture, Forestry and Fisheries in the Japanese Cabinet of Junichiro Koizumi
Keigo Higashino, Japanese mystery author
Kenyu Sugimoto, Japanese footballer
Ko Yong-hui, mother of North Korea's Supreme Commander, Kim Jong-un
KONAN, Japanese singer, tarento, and gravure idol
Maruse Taro, Zainichi Korean mime artist, comedian, vaudevillian and movie star (Japanese Real Name: Masanori Kimbara, Nihongo: 金原正典, Kanehara Masanori/Korean Real Name: Kim Kyun-hong, Hangul: 김균홍, Gim Gyun-hong)
Tsuyoshi Ihara, Zainichi Korean actor, martial artist, and writer (Real Name: Yun Yu-gu, Hangul: 윤유구, Yun Yu-gu) - Originally from Kitakyushu, Fukuoka, Japan
Zeus, Zainichi Korean professional wrestler and bodybuilder (Japanese Real Name: Kensho Obayashi, Nihongo: 大林 賢将, Ōbayashi Kenshō/Korean Real Name: Kim Bon-u, Hangul: 김본우, Gim Bon-u)

See also

 Shin-Ōkubo

References

External links

 Official website of Ikuno 
 Ikuno ward in Osaka ―Japanese Journal of Human Geography― 大阪市生野区・人文地理の論文

 
Wards of Osaka
Zainichi Korean culture